Phumelele Ace Bhengu (born 19 November 1989) is a South African footballer who plays as a winger or centre forward for Tshakhuma Madzivhandila.

Club career

Moroka Swallows
5 years after joining Moroka Swallows' youth academy at the age of 14, in 2008 Bhengu started playing senior football in the Premier Soccer League. After scoring a brace against Kaizer Chiefs Bhengu was praised and compared to Benni McCarthy.

Bay United
In January 2011, Bhengu joined Bay United on a 6-month loan deal. At Bay United, Bhengu reverted to playing as a striker.

Chippa United
In January 2013, Bhengu joined Chippa United on a two-and-a-half-year deal, but was released two weeks later with Chippa United citing a lack of match fitness as the reason.

Thanda Royal Zulu
In the second half of 2013, Bhengu joined Thanda Royal Zulu and started reviving his career.
Bhengu finished the 2014–15 season as the top-scorer, scoring 22 goals and setting a new National First Division record.

SuperSport United
After winning the National First Division's golden boot award, Bhengu turned down offers from Kaizer Chiefs and Mamelodi Sundowns to join SuperSport United.
Bhengu's first season with SuperSport United was not successful, managing only four substitute appearances, prompting him to request a loan move to gain game-time.

References

External links

1989 births
Living people
People from KwaZulu-Natal
South African soccer players
Association football wingers
Moroka Swallows F.C. players
Hapoel Nir Ramat HaSharon F.C. players
Chippa United F.C. players
Thanda Royal Zulu F.C. players
SuperSport United F.C. players
Royal Eagles F.C. players
Real Kings F.C. players
African Games silver medalists for South Africa
African Games medalists in football
Bay United F.C. players
Liga Leumit players
Competitors at the 2011 All-Africa Games
South African expatriate soccer players
Expatriate footballers in Israel
South African expatriate sportspeople in Israel